The Oak Mounds is a large prehistoric earthwork mound, and a smaller mound to the west. They are located outside Clarksburg, in Harrison County, West Virginia.

Mounds
These mounds have never been totally excavated but they were probably built between 1 and 1000 CE by the Hopewell culture mound builders, prehistoric indigenous peoples of eastern North America. The larger mound is about 12 feet high and 60 feet in diameter. A number of burials of important persons of the culture probably occurred in these mounds.

Site
An incorrectly worded historical marker sign is located on West Virginia Route 98 near the Veterans Administration Hospital. The sign errounously states the direction the mounds are relative to the sign itself, however the mounds are actually to the west, on the far side of the West Fork River, and not "Directly to the east..."  The sign's entire inscription reads: "Oak Mounds - Directly to the east are two earthen, domed burial mounds. The larger mound is some sixty feet in diameter and twelve feet high. Excavations in 1969 revealed flint tools, pottery shards and skeletal remains of two individuals. Site dates to about 100 BC, late Woodland Period."

See also
 Mound
 Mound builder (people)
 Effigy mound
 Earthwork (archaeology)
 Tumulus - burial mound
 List of Hopewell sites

References

Hopewellian peoples
Woodland period
Native American history of West Virginia
Archaeological sites in West Virginia
Mounds in West Virginia
Geography of Harrison County, West Virginia